CKWB-FM is a Canadian radio station, broadcasting at 97.9 FM in Westlock, Alberta. The station also serves the Barrhead area. The station currently airs a country format branded on-air as Real Country 97.9 and was owned by Newcap Radio until they were bought out by Stingray Group.

History
It's uncertain when the station signed on as CFOK, however, the station dates back to the 1971 as a rebroadcaster of CKBA-FM.

Over the years, the station has gone through different brandings, formats and ownerships.

Move to FM
On October 8, 2009, CFOK applied to convert to 97.9 MHz. The station received CRTC approval on February 19, 2010.

In August 2011, CFOK began testing on their new frequency at 97.9 MHz. After the official launch of the new station on 97.9 FM, the station's call sign would be CKWB-FM.

On September 6, 2011, at 6:00 am MDT, CFOK dropped its classic hits format and made its official move to 97.9 MHz as 97.9 The Range with its new call sign CKWB-FM and a country format. CFOK's old AM transmitter was shut down.

In November 2016, CKWB rebranded under the Real Country brand, as with other Newcap-owned country stations in Alberta.

References

External links

 
 (Current frequency)
 (Old frequency)

KWB
KWB
KWB
Westlock County
Radio stations established in 2011
2011 establishments in Alberta